Amtrak's Thames River Bridge spans from New London to Groton, Connecticut, United States, crossing Connecticut's Thames River.

Design and history
The bridge was originally a Strauss heel-trunnion Warren through-truss bascule design, built in 1919. It was built by the American Bridge Company for the New York, New Haven and Hartford Railroad, replacing a span dating from 1889. In June 2008, the bridge underwent replacement which included the span's conversion from a bascule to a vertical-lift mechanism.

As built in 1919, the bridge's abutments and piers were designed to carry a second set of double-track spans, in the event that an expansion to four tracks was ever undertaken at this location by the New Haven Railroad (it never was).

Operation

The bridge opens for marine traffic more than four times per day and serves up to 36 passenger trains and two freight trains per day.

It is one of eight moveable bridges on the Northeast Corridor through Connecticut surveyed in one multiple-property study in 1986.

See also
List of bridges documented by the Historic American Engineering Record in Connecticut

References

External links

Railroad bridges in Connecticut
Amtrak bridges
Buildings and structures in Groton, Connecticut
Buildings and structures in New London, Connecticut
Historic American Engineering Record in Connecticut
Bridges completed in 1919
Bridges in New London County, Connecticut
New York, New Haven and Hartford Railroad bridges
Vertical lift bridges in the United States
Bridges over the Thames River (Connecticut)
Steel bridges in the United States
Warren truss bridges in the United States
1919 establishments in Connecticut